American Norwegian is a koiné dialect of Norwegian spoken by Norwegian-Americans.

History

Immigration

American Norwegian formed as a result of Norwegians migrating to the United States.

In 1825, dozens of Norwegians left Stavanger on board the Restauration. Migration was largely due to religious persecution, particuarlly of Quakers and the Haugianerne. Throughout the 19th and 20th centuries, Norwegian migration to the North America continued, primarily through the White Star Line and the Cunard Line.

Speakers

Between 1910 and the First World War, one million Americans had Norwegian as their first language, many of whom subscribed to Norwegian-language newspapers, such as Decorah Posten and Skandinaven.

In comparison with Norwegian dialects

Differences

Variations in grammar indicate koineization.

Similarities
Pronouns in Norwegian and American dialects are relatively similar.

Archaism
While American Norwegian is not archaic in its use of grammar, its lexicon can be described as slightly archaic.

See also
 Urban East Norwegian – Norwegian dialect spoken in Oslo
 Bergensk – Norwegian dialect spoken in Bergen
 Trøndersk – Norwegian dialect spoken in Trøndelag
 American English – English dialect spoken in United States

References

Norwegian dialects
Norwegian-American culture
Languages of the United States